Vikramshila Setu is a bridge across the Ganges, near Bhagalpur in the Indian state of Bihar named after the ancient Mahavihara of Vikramashila which was established by King Dharmapala (783 to 820 A.D.) .

Vikramshila Setu is 6th longest bridge over water in India. The 4.7 km long  two lane bridge serves as a link between NH 33 and NH 31 running on the opposite sides of the Ganges. It runs from Barari Ghat on the Bhagalpur side on the south bank of the Ganges to Naugachia on the north bank. It also connects Bhagalpur to Purnia and Katihar.  This has reduced considerably the road travel between Bhagalpur and places across the Ganges.

However, there is intense traffic congestion on the bridge due to increased traffic and there is now a demand to construct another bridge parallel to it. On 21 September 2020 Prime Minister Mr Narendra Modi laid the foundation stone of another 4 lane road bridge of 4.445 km length over Ganga river parallel to Vikramshila Setu at cost of 1110.23 crore.
In June 2018, another 24 km-long Vikramshila - Kataria rail-cum-road bridge between Vikramshila railway station (near Pirpainty south of Ganga) and Kataria railway station (near Naugachia railway station) north of the Ganga, with an expenditure of 4,379.01 crore was approved.

See also
Bridges in Bihar
List of longest bridges in the world
List of longest bridges above water in India

References

Transport in Bhagalpur
Bridges over the Ganges
Tourist attractions in Bihar
Bridges in Bihar
Road bridges in India
Toll bridges in India
Bridges completed in 2001
2001 establishments in Bihar